Isaiah Michael Blackmon (born March 8, 1996) is an American professional basketball player who last played for Beşiktaş of the Basketball Super League (BSL). He played college basketball for the Saint Francis Red Flash.

Early life and high school career
Blackmon grew up in Charlotte, North Carolina and attended West Charlotte High School. He averaged 17 points and seven rebounds per game as a senior. Despite drawing some interest from Old Dominion, he was not offered a scholarship. Blackmon committed to play college basketball at Saint Francis University, his only Division I offer.

College career
Blackmon served as a key reserve and occasional starter as a true freshman, averaging 9.7 points per game before missing the final eight games of the season due to a knee injury. As a sophomore, he became the team's starting shooting guard and was named third team All-Northeast Conference after averaging 13.7 points per game. Blackmon suffered another knee injury three games into his junior year and was forced to use a medical redshirt. He was averaging 14.3 points per game in three games. He returned to the starting lineup as a redshirt junior and averaged 12.2 points per game. On February 18, 2020, Blackmon scored a career-high 30 points in addition to seven rebounds and four steals in a win over Robert Morris. As a redshirt senior, Blackmon was named the Northeast Conference Player of the Year. Blackmon averaged 18.8 points, 5.3 rebounds, and 1.7 steals on 45% shooting from the field and 41% shooting from three-point range.

Professional career
On July 3, 2020, Blackmon signed with Beşiktaş of the Turkish Basketball Super League (BSL).

Career statistics

College

|-
| style="text-align:left;"| 2015–16
| style="text-align:left;"| Saint Francis
| 19 || 4 || 22.6 || .538 || .400 || .711 || 3.4 || 1.3 || 1.0 || .3 || 9.7
|-
| style="text-align:left;"| 2016–17
| style="text-align:left;"| Saint Francis
| 31 || 21 || 27.3 || .478 || .500 || .735 || 4.4 || 1.4 || 1.0 || .1 || 13.7
|-
| style="text-align:left;"| 2017–18
| style="text-align:left;"| Saint Francis
| 3 || 3 || 28.0 || .432 || .300 || .727 || 3.0 || 1.0 || 1.7 || .3 || 14.3
|-
| style="text-align:left;"| 2018–19
| style="text-align:left;"| Saint Francis
| 32 || 19 || 29.0 || .406 || .380 || .726 || 4.8 || .9 || 1.1 || .3 || 12.2
|-
| style="text-align:left;"| 2019–20
| style="text-align:left;"| Saint Francis
| 30 || 30 || 34.1 || .449 || .412 || .832 || 5.3 || 1.5 || 1.7 || .3 || 18.8
|- class="sortbottom"
| style="text-align:center;" colspan="2"| Career
| 115 || 77 || 28.8 || .454 || .420 || .762 || 4.5 || 1.3 || 1.2 || .3 || 14.0

References

External links
Saint Francis Red Flash bio
RealGM profile

1996 births
Living people
African-American basketball players
American expatriate basketball people in Turkey
American men's basketball players
Basketball players from Charlotte, North Carolina
Beşiktaş men's basketball players
Saint Francis Red Flash men's basketball players
Shooting guards
Small forwards
21st-century African-American sportspeople